Clicks & Cuts, Vol. 2 is the second volume in the Clicks & Cuts Series released by Mille Plateaux in 2001. The triple album was released as an attempt to investigate and define the glitch music aesthetic in its early 2000s popularity.

Track listing

2001 compilation albums